Embry–Riddle Aeronautical University, Prescott is a residential campus of Embry-Riddle Aeronautical University in Prescott, Arizona. The university offers bachelor and master's in arts, sciences, aviation, business, engineering, and security & intelligence. The Prescott campus also offers a master's degree in Safety Science, Security & Intelligence, and Cyber Intelligence & Security.

History 

Embry-Riddle began in 1925 as the Embry-Riddle Company, an aircraft dealer, and airmail provider, founded by Talton Higbee Embry and John Paul Riddle in Cincinnati, Ohio. Embry-Riddle was eventually incorporated into what is now American Airlines, before reforming during the buildup to World War II in Miami, Florida as the Embry-Riddle School of Aviation, and later, the Embry-Riddle Aeronautical Institute. Embry-Riddle moved to Daytona Beach, Florida in 1965 and was renamed Embry-Riddle Aeronautical University in 1970.

Embry-Riddle opened its second campus in Prescott, Arizona in 1978. Embry-Riddle purchased the former campus of Prescott College, which closed abruptly in 1974 from financial hardship.

Campus 
All campus life is centered in a  area. The high-desert climate offers nearly 300 days of sunshine a year. The campus has an enrollment of about 2,600 students and is covered in north western terrain.

Academic buildings 
The Aerospace Experimentation and Fabrication Building (AXFAB) holds a fabrication suite with a machine shop and two connected fabrication areas for senior design projects. The Material Science Lab and Materials Testing Lab are also housed in AXFAB, along with the Structures Lab and the Structural Dynamics Lab. The Space Systems lab houses a satellite ground station which operates on amateur radio bands as well as equipment to allow students to simulate attitude control of satellites. The Composites Lab enables students to fabricate composite parts and the Rapid Prototyping Lab contains stereo-lithography printers for student use.

The King Engineering and Technology Center is where most of the electrical engineering and computer engineering classes occur. This building contains a design suite for autonomous vehicles and freshman engineering lab which allow students to build robots, lighter-than-air vehicles, and more. The control theory lab, digital circuits lab, and linear circuits lab all give students the hands-on experience in electronics. The power lab lets students design, fabricate, and test power electronics, and the senior eesign suite is a place for students to work on their capstone projects.

The Tracy Doryland Wind Tunnel Laboratory contains an aerodynamics laboratory with four wind tunnels for undergraduate students' use. The thermal/fluid laboratory contains a water tunnel to demonstrate fluid flow. The propulsion lab has a micro-turbojet which is used to study advanced propulsion.

The STEM education center and the Jim and Linda Lee Planetarium, which is the only planetarium in Arizona that is north of Phoenix, is used as a community outreach tool that houses state of the art lab space that is used by students as well as local middle and high school students in order to promote STEM related education.

Academic Complex I (ACI) houses faculty offices, computer and meteorology labs, two lecture halls and a number of classrooms.

The Christine & Stephen F. Udvar–Hazy Library and Learning Center is used as a community information and research hub.

The Robertson Aviation Safety Center II (RASCII) houses the Aviation Safety & Security Archives (ASASA) where the Robertson papers and other crash investigators' papers are housed as well as the state of the art ERGO Lab where students research the ergonomics of the human body.

The Robertson Aviation Safety Center (RASC I) houses an extremely thorough accident investigation lab, which provides students very comprehensive hands on undergraduate, minor, and graduate work.

The Observatory is the recourse for Space Physics students as well as the very active and diverse astronomy community that resides in Prescott Arizona.

The Glen Doherty Center for Security and Intelligence Studies houses the College of Security and Intelligence as well as a state of the art Hacker Lab.

The Davis Learning Center Auditorium has a large auditorium that can be used for various events as well as many smaller classrooms outlining the structure.

Residences 
There are five housing communities on campus currently:

 Mingus Mountain Complex (Halls 1–5) [Freshmen Housing]
 Thumb Butte Complex Apartments [T1]
 Thumb Butte Complex Modulars [M100–M400]
 Thumb Butte Complex Suites [T2]
 Village Complex Apartments/Suites (Halls 6–10) [The Village]

Academics 

Academics at the Prescott campus are organized into four colleges:

 College of Arts and Sciences
 College of Aviation
 College of Engineering
 College of Security and Intelligence

The programs in aeronautics, air traffic management, applied meteorology, and aerospace studies are certified by the Federal Aviation Administration (FAA). In July 2014, the university also became the nation's first FAA-approved training provider for student airline certification.

ERAU Prescott has the nation's first College of Security and Intelligence. This degree program focuses on global issues such as terrorism, information warfare, transportation security, illicit trafficking networks, corporate security, population dislocations, natural disasters, widespread epidemics, cyber security and international crime and homeland security.

Student body 
Embry-Riddle's total fall 2016 undergraduate enrollment at the Prescott campus was 2,400 students, 24% of which were female. International students make up 4.2% of the Prescott campus's undergraduate enrollment.

A student-operated newspaper, Horizons, publishes every 2 weeks during the school year. The campus also has Riddle Radio, which broadcasts outdoors in the Student Union area, on the Internet at its website, and on AM 1640. Over 90 student clubs and organizations are approved for Fall 2013. These include fraternities and sororities, service clubs, academic clubs, athletic clubs and special interest/activities clubs.

The Prescott campus is home to the Golden Eagles Flight Team, which competes in the National Intercollegiate Flying Association. Prescott's Golden Eagles Flight Team has won the regional championship each year for the past 31 years, and the team is also twelve-time National Champions winning in 1993, 1997, 1999, 2003, 2005, 2007, 2008, 2012, 2013, 2016, 2017, and 2018.
With their twelve national wins, the team has also been inducted into the San Diego Air & Space Museum's Hall of Fame.

Athletics
The athletic teams of Embry–Riddle's Prescott campus are called the Eagles. The university is a member of the National Association of Intercollegiate Athletics (NAIA), primarily competing in the California Pacific Conference (Cal Pac) since the 2012–13 academic year.

ERAU–Prescott competes in 14 intercollegiate varsity sports: Men's sports include baseball, basketball, cross country, golf, soccer, track & field (outdoor only) and wrestling; women's sports include basketball, cross country, golf, soccer, softball, track & field (outdoor only) and volleyball.

Club sports
There are several club sports as well: baseball, rugby, cheer squad, dance team, archery, golf, indoor soccer, lacrosse, ultimate, softball and ice hockey.

Facilities
Athletic facilities on campus include indoor volleyball and basketball courts, a fitness center, a training room with a whirlpool, a multi-purpose gym, and a matted room for wrestling, aerobics, and martial arts. Other facilities include a softball field, intercollegiate soccer field, tennis courts, sand volleyball courts, a 25-yard outdoor swimming pool, racquetball courts, a running track and a multi-sport recreation field. The fitness center is currently undergoing a major renovation of facilities due for completion in the next 3 years.

See also 

 Embry-Riddle Aeronautical University
 Embry-Riddle Aeronautical University, Daytona Beach
 List of Embry-Riddle Aeronautical University alumni
 List of aerospace engineering schools

References

External links 
 
 Official athletics website

Private universities and colleges in Arizona
Aviation schools in the United States
Buildings and structures in Prescott, Arizona
Educational institutions established in 1978
Education in Yavapai County, Arizona
1978 establishments in Arizona
Embry–Riddle Aeronautical University
California Pacific Conference schools